Jim Heal is an American football coach.  He served as the head football coach at West Virginia University Institute of Technology in Montgomery, West Virginia for 6 seasons, from 1983 to 1988, compiling a record of 26–32–2.

References

Year of birth missing (living people)
Living people
West Virginia Tech Golden Bears football coaches